São Paulo plane crash can refer to any of the following plane crashes which occurred in São Paulo, Brazil:

TAM Airlines Flight 3054, which occurred on July 17, 2007
TAM Transportes Aéreos Regionais Flight 402, which occurred on October 31, 1996